Northumberland was launched at South Shields in 1797. She made one voyage for the British East India Company (EIC). She then traded with the West Indies until she wrecked in 1805.

Career
EIC voyage (1797-1799): Captain Samuel Aikman, or Andrew Aickman, or Ackman, sailed Northumberland from her berth on 25 June 1797. She left Torbay on 22 September 1797, bound for Bengal. Northumberland arrived at the Cape of Good Hope on 15 December, and left on 15 April 1798. On 25 January 1799 she was sailing "towards England". She returned to her moorings 7 February.

Lloyd's Register for 1799 showed Northumberlands trade changing from London—India to London—Jamaica.

Lloyd's Register for 1805 showed Northumberlands master changing from J. Proctor to Gibbs. Her trade is still London—Jamaica.

Loss
Northumberland, Gibb, master, was totally lost on the Charleston Bar, South Carolina, on 14 October 1805; her crew was saved. She was on a voyage from Jamaica to London when she became distressed and so attempted to put into Charleston.

Citations and references
Citations

References
 

1797 ships
Ships built by Temple shipbuilders
Ships of the British East India Company
Age of Sail merchant ships
Merchant ships of the United Kingdom
Maritime incidents in 1805
Shipwrecks of the Carolina coast